Mokwan may refer to:

Mokwan, the way the Dorobo peoples refer to Sirikwa culture. 

Mokwan, as jããnkun (marshallese dried pandanus paste) is called in the northern atolls of the Marshall Islands.